The Czech Republic men's national under-18 basketball team is a national basketball team of the Czech Republic, administered  by the Czech Basketball Federation. It represents the country in international men's under-18 basketball competitions.

FIBA U18 European Championship participations

See also
Czech Republic men's national basketball team
Czech Republic men's national under-17 basketball team
Czech Republic women's national under-19 basketball team

References

External links
Official website 
Archived records of the Czech Republic team participations

Basketball in the Czech Republic
Basketball
Men's national under-18 basketball teams